Gigia is a genus of moths of the family Erebidae. The genus was erected by Francis Walker in 1865.

Species
Gigia obliqua Walker, 1865
Gigia stenogaster Felder, 1874

References

Calpinae